The pisometacarpal ligament joins the pisiform to the base of the fifth metacarpal bone. It is a continuation of the tendon of the flexor carpi ulnaris.

Additional images

References

External links
 https://web.archive.org/web/20070806224310/http://classes.kumc.edu/sah/resources/handkines/ligaments/wvdpisometa.htm

Ligaments of the upper limb